All My Friends Are Funeral Singers is a 2009 album by Califone. The album was the first release by Califone on Dead Oceans. The 2LP version of the album contains a bonus track, called "Lunar H", on side 4. The track Buñuel is biographical of Spanish filmmaker Luis Buñuel.

Track listing
"Giving Away the Bride" - 6:26	
"Polish Girls" - 3:04
"1928" - 4:29	
"Funeral Singers" - 4:09	
"Snake's Tooth = Protection Against Fever And Luck In Gambling" - 0:37	
"Buñuel" - 4:25
"Ape-Like" - 2:22
"A Wish Made While Burning Onions Will Come True" - 0:43
"Evidence" - 5:02
"Alice Marble Gray" - 3:42
"Salt" - 2:52
"Krill" - 6:10
"Seven, Fourteen, Or Twenty-One Knots" - 1:22
"Better Angels" - 4:08

References

External links
 All My Friends Are Funeral Singers at DeadOceans.com

2009 albums
Califone albums
Dead Oceans albums